Donja Vijaka is a village in the municipality of Vareš, Bosnia and Herzegovina. It was formerly named Vijaka Donja.

Demographics 
According to the 2013 census, its population was 37, all Croats.

References

Populated places in Vareš